Federico Eduardo Lértora (born 5 July 1990) is an Argentine professional footballer who plays as a midfielder for Liga MX club Tijuana.

Career
Lértora's first career club was Ferro Carril Oeste of Primera B Nacional, he made his debut for Ferro on 18 October 2008 in a league encounter against Los Andes. Two games later, he scored his first professional goal in an away win versus Chacarita Juniors. Between 2008–09 and 2011–12, Lértora made 112 appearances and scored seven goals for the club. In January 2012, Lértora joined Argentine Primera División team Godoy Cruz on loan. He played 15 times during the 2011–12 season prior to making the move permanent in July 2012.

On 7 July 2015, Lértora agreed to join fellow Primera División club Arsenal de Sarandí. 28 appearances and 1 goal followed for him in Sarandí before departing in 2016 to complete a transfer to Belgrano. He made his Belgrano debut on 28 August against Independiente.

Career statistics

References

External links

1990 births
Living people
People from Mercedes, Buenos Aires
Argentine footballers
Association football midfielders
Primera Nacional players
Argentine Primera División players
Ferro Carril Oeste footballers
Godoy Cruz Antonio Tomba footballers
Arsenal de Sarandí footballers
Club Atlético Belgrano footballers
Club Atlético Colón footballers
Sportspeople from Buenos Aires Province